Shimizu Koto Blue Sharks – nicknamed the Blue Sharks – are a Japanese rugby union team, currently playing in the Japan Rugby League One. The team is the rugby team of architectural, civil engineering and general contracting firm Shimizu, based in Chūō in Tokyo.

The team was created in 1976 as the rugby union team for Shimizu Corporation. When rugby union in Japan was restructured in 2003 with the introduction of the Top League, Shimizu Blue Sharks was allocated to the second tier Top East League. They were relegated after the 2007–08 season, and played in lower leagues for a decade. They won promotion back for the 2017–18 season, where they secured a fourth-place finish. The following season, they won the competition, and also won their promotion play-off match against Chugoku Red Regulions to be promoted to the Top Challenge League for 2019.

The team rebranded as Shimizu Koto Blue Sharks ahead of the rebranding of the Top League to the Japan Rugby League One in 2022.

Squad

The Shimizu Koto Blue Sharks squad for the 2023 season is:

External links

References

Rugby clubs established in 1976
1976 establishments in Japan
Japan Rugby League One teams